Muhammed Alamgir (born 16 June 1963) is a Bangladeshi academic who served as the vice-chancellor of Khulna University of Engineering & Technology.

Education
Alamgir completed his bachelor's and master's from Bangladesh University of Engineering and Technology in 1986 and 1989 respectively. He then earned his Ph.D. from Saga University in 1996.

Alamgir was appointed the vice-chancellor position in August 2014 for the second term. He was appointed to the University Grants Commission in June 2019.

References

Living people
1963 births
Bangladeshi academics
Bangladesh University of Engineering and Technology alumni
Saga University alumni
Academic staff of Khulna University of Engineering & Technology